Judson Campbell Logan (July 19, 1959 – January 3, 2022) was an American athlete. He won a gold medal in the hammer throw at the 1987 Pan American Games in Indianapolis. Logan competed in four Summer Olympics, starting in 1984.  His best finish was 13th in the qualifying round in 1984.

Biography
Logan had bests of 49-11 (SP) and 171-11 (DT) in high school, but did not qualify for the state meet. He is quoted of saying, "And I made it to four Olympics. That's what I tell kids now: never give up on your dreams."

He played Tight End in high school football and attended Kent State University playing football for two and a half seasons.  He was but a walk-on to the track team and was known to give his medals away to children who watch the competition, saying "I'm not into collecting or saving medals. Maybe it will mean more to them than it will to me. But it makes me feel good."

He was for a time, the oldest top-level U.S. track star. After turning 40 in 1999, Logan was still determined to continue throwing.
"I'm going to keep throwing until there are three guys who can keep me off the Olympic team. As long as I can make the A standards for the Worlds and Olympics, and keep making teams, I'm going to keep doing it." Following that statement he made his fourth Olympic team and threw in the 2000 Summer Olympics. He had continued throwing into the Masters division, setting the world M50 record in 2009.

Later life
Logan resided in Ashland, Ohio, where he coached the Ashland University track team.  He became head coach in 2004 and was named Indoor Men's Coach of the Year in the Great Lakes Intercollegiate Athletic Conference in 2008–2009. 

He died from complications of COVID-19 in Ashland on January 3, 2022, at age 62. He was also being treated for leukemia for the two years prior to his death.

Achievements

References

SR|Olympics Sports-Jud Logan

1959 births
2022 deaths
People from Ashland, Ohio
Sportspeople from Canton, Ohio
Track and field athletes from Ohio
American male hammer throwers
Male weight throwers
American masters athletes
Olympic track and field athletes of the United States
Athletes (track and field) at the 1984 Summer Olympics
Athletes (track and field) at the 1988 Summer Olympics
Athletes (track and field) at the 1992 Summer Olympics
Athletes (track and field) at the 2000 Summer Olympics
Pan American Games track and field athletes for the United States
Pan American Games medalists in athletics (track and field)
Pan American Games gold medalists for the United States
Pan American Games silver medalists for the United States
Athletes (track and field) at the 1987 Pan American Games
Athletes (track and field) at the 1991 Pan American Games
Kent State Golden Flashes football players
Ashland University people
World record holders in masters athletics
Competitors at the 1986 Goodwill Games
Medalists at the 1987 Pan American Games
Medalists at the 1991 Pan American Games
Deaths from the COVID-19 pandemic in Ohio